The 3rd Army (Armata a 3-a Română) was a field army of the Romanian Land Forces active from the 19th century to the 1990s. It fought as part of the German Army Group B during World War II, in Ukraine, the Crimea, and the Caucasus. General Petre Dumitrescu commanded the 3rd Army for a period.

World War I 

After Romania entered World War I in August 1916 on the side of the Allies, the Third Army defended the border with Bulgaria, while the rest of the Romanian Army engaged in the Battle of Transylvania. When a Bulgarian-German army under August von Mackensen invaded Romania in September 1916, the Third Army made attempts to withstand the enemy offensive at Silistra, Bazargic, Amzacea and Topraisar, but had to withdraw under the pressure of superior enemy forces after the Second Battle of Cobadin. After the Flămânda Offensive, the Third Army was disbanded.

The commanders of the 3rd Army during that time were :
 Divisional General Mihail Aslan: 27 August 1916 – 7 September 1916	
 Divisional General Alexandru Averescu: 7 September 1916 – 7 October 1916

World War II 
On 22 June 1941 the 3rd Army comprised the 4th Army Corps (6th and 7th Infantry Divisions), the Cavalry Corps (5th and 8th Cavalry Brigades), the Mountain Corps (1st, 2nd, and 4th Mountain Brigades), two separate artillery battalions, a target acquisition battery, and the Air Forces's 3rd Army Cooperation Command.

For Operation München, in the north, the 3rd Army was reduced only to the Mountain Corps (the 1st, 2nd and 4th Mountain Brigades, 8th Cavalry Brigade and 7th Infantry Division), because the Cavalry Corps (5th and 6th Cavalry Brigades) had been subordinated directly to the German Eleventh Army. In fact the 3rd Army command did not have any operative attributes until 2 July 1941, when the ground offensive started also in the Romanian sector.

In 1942 in the Battle of the Caucasus, the 3rd Army initially consisted of the Cavalry Corps (5th, 6th and 9th Cavalry Divisions) and the 1st Army Corps (2nd Mountain Division and German 298th Infantry Division). The 3rd Army was subordinated to the German 17th Army. It also had 3 observation squadrons assigned to it. However, after reorganization, on 7 August, only the Cavalry Corps remained with it.

Battle of Stalingrad

Along with the Romanian Fourth Army, the Third Army bore the brunt of the Soviet Operation Uranus, which saw the German Sixth Army encircled and destroyed during the Battle of Stalingrad.

To make things worse, the Soviets had two bridgeheads over the Don River, at Serafimovich and Kletskaya, which the German High Command ignored, despite repeated requests by General Dumitrescu for permission to eliminate them. At the start of the Soviet offensive in November 1942, the Third Army had a nominal strength of 152,492 Romanian troops and 11,211 German troops, being made up from 1st, 2nd, 4th and 5th Corps in a single echelon (1st Cavalry, 5th, 6th, 7th, 9th, 11th, 13th and 14th Infantry Divisions) from West to East, with 7th Cavalry and 15th Infantry Divisions in reserve. The Long Range Recon (DO-17M) and the 112th Liaison Squadrons (Fleet 10G) were also at its disposal. In November came the German XLVIII Panzer Corps, composed of the 22nd German Panzer Division and the 1st Romanian Armored Division, which also was put in reserve. It also had the 2nd, 4th, 5th, and 8th Motorized Heavy Artillery Regiments and the 41st Independent Motorized Heavy Artillery Battalion. Opposite the 3rd Army was the Southwestern Front, comprising the Soviet 1st Guards Army, 5th Tank Army, and 21st Army, with a force of 5,888 artillery pieces, 728 tanks, and 790 planes.

On 19 November at 0530, in the sector of the Third Romanian Army, a violent artillery barrage battered the entire front line. The weather conditions were harsh: blizzards, snow, which made close air support impossible. The Soviets assaulted the positions of the 14th Infantry Division with the 5th Tank Army and the junction between the 13th Infantry Division and the 1st Cavalry Division with the 21st Army, with a total of 338,631 men against three weak divisions. The 37mm and 47mm AT guns were useless against Soviet T-34 tanks, so the Romanian troops had to use grenades, anti-tank mines and Molotov cocktails. In the first hours, they managed to delay the advance and destroy some tanks, but later they had to retreat or face encirclement. The Soviets also attacked west of Sarisa Valley and at Raspopinskaya, but were repulsed. In response to the situation that developed south of Kletskaya, the German 48th Panzer Corps was ordered to move towards the Soviet main thrust and shortly afterwards, the 22nd Panzer Division was redirected to the northwest towards Bolsoy and, reaching Petshany, it engaged Soviet armor. By evening, the 1st Romanian Armored Division reached Sirkovsky, making preparations to attack Bolsoy the next day.

On 20 November, the Soviet armored and motorized forces advanced towards Kalach, with the intention of encircling the 6th Army embroiled in ferocious fighting at Stalingrad. The 22nd Panzer Division, overwhelmed at Petshany by the large number of Soviet tanks, withdrew north to Bol. Donschynka. The Romanian 1st Armored Division, without any available radio contact, tried to advance to Petshany in order to make the junction with the 22nd Panzer Division, but was forced to stop a few kilometers west of Korotovsky by stiff Soviet resistance and numerous counterattacks by Soviet tanks, flowing between the German 22nd and the Romanian 1st, occupying the Varlamovsky and Peralasovsky villages and making the junction with forces coming from Gromsky, thus encircling the 5th Corps. In the 4th Corps' sector, 40 Soviet tanks attacked the 15th Infantry Division but were repulsed by evening with heavy losses. Meanwhile, the 7th Cavalry Division unsuccessfully tried to block the enemy's advance; the right wing of the division, which had fully received the blow, retreated south while the left wing was reassigned to the 9th Infantry Division. Also, the 1st Cavalry Division had to retreat towards Stalingrad and was subordinated to the 6th Army.

At the end of the day, the defensive position of the Third Romanian Army had a 70 km wide gap in the centre. In this pocket were encircled the 1st Armored Division, three infantry divisions (5th, 6th, and 15th), and remains of other two infantry divisions (13th and 14th). The former commander of the 6th Infantry Division, Major General Mihail Lascăr, took command of the troops from the infantry divisions and formed the "General Lascăr" Group (40,000 men). At this point, the command point of the Third Army began moving to Morozovskaya.

On 21 November, the 22nd Panzer Division tried to advance towards Perelasovsky in order to make the junction with the 1st Armored Division and to relieve the "General Lascăr" Group, but failed and was stopped the next day between Bol. Donschynka and Perelasovky. The 1st Romanian Armored Division advanced towards Bol. Donschynka, where it was hoping to find the German division, but the village was under Soviet control and then headed south and, after grim fighting, crossed the Chir River on 25 November.

On 22 November, the encircled "General Lascăr" Group, which had been ordered to resist at any cost, was attacked and transmitted its last message. They had run out of food and each gun had only 40 rounds left and after refusing the Soviet proposal to surrender they were entirely destroyed. Only the 1st Battalion of the 15 Infantry Regiment (6th infantry Division), commanded by Major Gheorghe Răscănescu, succeeded in getting to the Chir River with all its soldiers and equipment. His battalion had managed to prevent the Soviet 8th Cavalry Division from capturing the vital German airfield at Oblivskaya from 26 November to 3 December.

On 23 November, the Soviet troops of the South-Western Front and of the Stalingrad Front met at Kalach-na-Donu, completing the encirclement of the German 6th Army, parts of the Romanian 4th Army, and six other Romanian infantry divisions as well as one cavalry division.

World War II Commanders
 General lieutenant Petre Dumitrescu, 25 March 1941 – 20 March 1943
 General lieutenant Dumitru I. Popescu, 21 March 1943 – 20 April 1943
 General Petre Dumitrescu, 21 April 1943 – 29 August 1944
 General lieutenant Nicolae Dăscălescu (acting), 29 August 1944 – 10 September 1944

Later in the war and postwar
It later fought as part of a Soviet Front after Romania changed sides, and then existed during the Cold War, possibly up until 1989.

The reported 1989 order of battle was:

3rd Army Command - Craiova with General Dumitru Roșu as Army Commander, had: 
2nd Mechanised Division "Mihai Viteazul" (Cat B) - Craiova: with TR-85 and T-34 tanks, TAB-71M & BTR-60PB APCs, TABC-79 & BRDM-2 Recce. Armd. Vehicles, S-60 57mm. and Md.1980 30mm. AA Guns, M-30 122mm. and Md.1981 152mm howitzers, APR-40 122mm. MRLs. 
18th Mechanized Division "Decebal" (Cat B) - Timișoara with T-55 and T-34 tanks, TAB-71 & BTR-60PB APCs, TABC-79 & BRDM-2 Recce. Armd. Vehicles, S-60 57mm. and Md.1980 30mm. AA Guns, M-30 122mm. and Md.1981 152mm howitzers, APR-21 122mm. MRLs., 9K52 "Luna-M" rocket systems, 
7th Tank Brigade -Slatina: with TR-85 tanks, TAB-71M APCs, MLI-84 IFVs, TABC-79 Recce. Armd. Vehicles, Md.1980 30mm. AA Guns, M-30 122mm. and Md.1981 152mm howitzers, APR-40 122mm. MRLs. 
5th Mountain Brigade -Alba Iulia

References

External links
Third Army in Crimea -  1941
http://niehorster.org/031_rumania/42-06/_army_03.html - 3rd Army 28 June 1942

3rd
Romania
Military units and formations of Romania in World War II
Military units and formations disestablished in the 1990s